Manfred Zapf (born 24 August 1946 in Stapelburg) is a German former footballer, later a coach. A defender, Zapf spent his entire senior career with 1. FC Magdeburg, and captained the club to its greatest successes – three DDR championships, four cups, and the Cup Winners' Cup of 1974. In his time with the club he appeared in 327 league matches in the DDR-Oberliga and played 30 matches in the second-tier DDR-Liga.

He won sixteen (respectively 12) caps for East Germany between 1969 and 1975, and was part of the team that won the Bronze medal at the 1972 Olympics.

Following his retirement from footballing, Zapf joined the backroom staff at FC Magdeburg, and also had a three-month spell as manager of the East Germany national team in 1988–89.

References

1946 births
Living people
German footballers
East German footballers
East Germany international footballers
Olympic footballers of East Germany
Footballers at the 1972 Summer Olympics
Olympic bronze medalists for East Germany
Association football defenders
1. FC Magdeburg players
German football managers
East German football managers
East Germany national football team managers
Olympic medalists in football
Medalists at the 1972 Summer Olympics
DDR-Oberliga players
People from Bezirk Magdeburg
Footballers from Saxony-Anhalt
People from Harz (district)